Geraldo Bajrami (born 24 September 1999) is a professional footballer who plays as a defender for National League club Notts County. He came through the youth system at Birmingham City, and made his EFL Championship debut in 2019. He spent time on loan at Solihull Moors of the National League in 2020, and was released in 2021. Bajrami was born in England to Albanian parents, and has represented Albania at under-21 level.

Club career
Bajrami was born in Birmingham in 1999, just two weeks after his Albanian parents left Kosovo because of the war. He was raised in the Quinton district and attended Priory School in Edgbaston. He had two unsuccessful trials with Birmingham City's Academy before he was accepted at under-14 level, and took up a two-year scholarship in July 2016. Academy coach Steve Spooner described him as "quite an unassuming young man but is very much a leader and is very popular with the rest of the players."

He captained the club's under-18 team that reached the semifinal of the 2017–18 FA Youth Cup, performing well in a defensive partnership with Ryan Stirk against a very strong Chelsea side, and signed his first professional contract, of one year, at the end of the season. He went on to captain Birmingham's under-23 team in 2018–19, making 36 appearances over the season, as they finished as runners-up in the Professional Development League northern section and lost out to Leeds United on penalties for the overall title. He was offered a two-year deal in March 2019, and signed it in late June.

A hernia operation at the end of the season meant that Bajrami missed out on the first-team's pre-season fixtures. He was fit to make his competitive debut in the EFL Cup first round on 6 August 2019. Manager Pep Clotet fielded an inexperienced team for the visit to Portsmouth, and Bajrami played the whole of the 3–0 defeat. With Marc Roberts and Jake Clarke-Salter injured, he made his Football League debut on 14 December 2019, partnering Harlee Dean in central defence in a 3–2 defeat at home to Championship leaders West Bromwich Albion. He kept his place for the next match, a 3–0 loss to Hull City, before Clotet tried other options.

Bajrami joined National League club Solihull Moors on 20 February 2020 on a youth loan to the end of the season. He had made four appearances in the starting eleven by the time the National League season was first suspended and then ended early because of the COVID-19 pandemic. He was an unused substitute for Birmingham at the end of that season, and was not part of the first-team matchday squad at all in 2020–21. In May 2021, the club confirmed that he would leave when his contract expired at the end of the season. His last appearance was for Birmingham's U23 team as they beat Sheffield United U23 in the national final of the 2020–21 Professional Development League.

Bajrami signed for National League North club Kidderminster Harriers on 19 August 2021, and made his debut two days later, starting in a 3–0 win against Blyth Spartans in place of Keith Lowe, who was unavailable because of illness.

On 24 June 2022, Bajrami signed for National League club Notts County alongside Kidderminster teammate Sam Austin, Bajrami signing for a compensation fee on a two-year contract.

International career
In January 2019, Bajrami attended a training camp for Albanian youth players, and applied for an Albanian passport in the hope of being selected for their under-21 team ahead of the upcoming 2021 European Championship qualifiers. He made his debut in the starting eleven for a 2–1 defeat at home to Turkey U21 on 23 March; he played the whole match, and was booked in the second half. He made eight appearances in all.

Career statistics

References

1999 births
Living people
Footballers from Birmingham, West Midlands
Albanian footballers
Albania under-21 international footballers
English footballers
Association football defenders
Birmingham City F.C. players
Solihull Moors F.C. players
Kidderminster Harriers F.C. players
Notts County F.C. players
English Football League players
National League (English football) players
English people of Albanian descent